Harry Markey Grayson (May 10, 1894 – September 30, 1968) was an American sportswriter.  He was the sports editor of the Newspaper Enterprise Association from 1934 to 1963.

Selected works by Grayson

Baseball
Wagner and Mathewson Top National Loop's All-Time Greats (Honus Wagner/Christy Mathewson), February 5, 1936
Landis To Smash Cards Syndicate, March 18, 1938
Scott Gives Gehrig Three More Seasons (Lou Gehrig), May 2, 1939
He Wants To Be A Fireman: Eccentric Ted Williams Wants To Quit Baseball (Ted Williams), May 28, 1940
Feller May Win 30 As Indians Race Tigers Down Home Stretch (Bob Feller), August 19, 1940
Scandal Broke Up "Greatest Team" (Black Sox Scandal), December 3, 1944
Rickey Is Running Dodgers, Accounting for All Confusion (Branch Rickey), April 20, 1948
Baseball World Mourns Passing of Most Glamorous Figure: Babe Pulled Game From Doldrums, Made Baseball What It Is Today (Babe Ruth), August 17, 1948
Dodgers' 'Flying Ebony' Was Most Feared Man in Series (Jackie Robinson), October 13, 1949
 Stengel's Multiple Moves Have Managers Emulating Puppeteers (Casey Stengel), June 27, 1953
Bad Pitches, Sulking Remain Mantle's Big Faults (Mickey Mantle), February 28, 1957
Cobb, Out of Baseball for 29 Years, Doubts Umps' Vision, July 27, 1957
Berra Gets Rich Hitting 325 Foot Home Runs (Yogi Berra), June 25, 1962
Help Wanted: Kaline Could Carry Club If He Had One To Carry (Al Kaline), June 22, 1963
American League Is Sick, Sick, Sick, June 21, 1964

"They Played The Game"
In 1943, Grayson published a series of profiles on the great figures in baseball history.  The series was published in newspapers under the name, "They Played The Game." This section links to a number of those articles.  The following year, the articles were compiled into a book having the same title.
Bad Loser Cobb Stands Alone As Fiery Genius of Baseball (Ty Cobb), March 28, 1943
Johnson's Hurling An Open Book: Yet Big Train Threw Past Best of Hitters (Walter Johnson), March 31, 1943
The Great Rajah! (Rogers Hornsby), April 28, 1943
Baker's Home Runs Meant Something (Home Run Baker), April 1, 1943
 Ruth Drew $80,000 A Year And Was Grossly Underpaid (Babe Ruth), April 6, 1943
Collins Calls Plank Greatest Pitcher; Kept Batters Waiting (Eddie Plank), April 19, 1943
Tinker To Evers To Chance: Names That Spelled Double (Baseball's Sad Lexicon), April 20, 1943
Eddie Collins Simply Had To Be Doing Something (Eddie Collins), April 21, 1943
Black Sox Expunged From Records, But How They Could Play the Game! (Black Sox Scandal), April 26, 1943
Effortless, Matchless for 19 Years, Alex Picked Up Where Young Left Off (Grover Cleveland Alexander), April 28, 1943
Delahanty Was Ruth of Dead Ball Days (Ed Delahanty), May 3, 1943
Sisler, The Picture Player, Came Closest To Being a Cobb (George Sisler), May 5, 1943
Severed Finger Helped Mordecai Brown to Achieve Rank Among Greatest Pitchers (Mordecai Brown), May 7, 1943
Ed Walsh, The Greatest Of Spitballers, Pitched His Arm Off For the White Sox (Ed Walsh), May 9, 1943
Quick-on-the-Trigger Kelly Played Ball Like Cobb 25 Years Before (King Kelly), May 9, 1943
Vance Was Violent Pitcher With Power, Speed To Burn (Dazzy Vance), May 26, 1943
Watching Clam Shell Sail Gave Gave First Curve Ball To Cummings; They Said It Couldn't Be Done (Candy Cummings), May 28, 1943
Collins Third Base Stylist; Couldn't Hit Ball Past Him (Jimmy Collins), June 2, 1943
Huggins Excelled As Lead-Off Man (Miller Huggins), June 5, 1943
Five Consecutive Shutouts Record Still Held by White (Doc White), June 5, 1943
Anson An Idol Who Never Fell; Real Leader In Every Respect (Cap Anson), June 8, 1943
Southpaw Rube Waddell Eccentric But How He Could Throw a Ball (Rube Waddell, June 15, 1943
Trouble Followed Storm-Center Mays; Sore Arm Made Him Pitch Underhand (Carl Mays), June 16, 1943
Altrock Wasn't Always A Clown; Was Great Pitcher (Nick Altrock), June 20, 1943
Scott Padded Shoes To Escape Being Cut; Played 1307 Straight Games At Short (Everett Scott), June 21, 1943
Zack Wheat Claimed Honor As Brooklyn's Most Popular (Zack Wheat), June 29, 1943
Griffith Gained Tag, Old Fox, as Mound Ace for Cap Anson (Clark Griffith), July 8, 1943
Sockalexis Socked Like Ruth, Was Faster Than Cobb, Threw a la Meusel (Louis Sockalexis), August 5, 1943

Football
Rose Bowl Game Needs Huey Long: Kingfish Would Make Tilt Really 'Greatest Show on Earth' in 1935, November 6, 1934
Rose Bowl Battle A Classic Despite Criticism (Rose Bowl), December 26, 1934
Redskins Meet Packers Sunday (1936 NFL Championship Game), December 9, 1936
Army-Navy Is Great Show Regardless of Records, December 6, 1963

Hockey
Ice Hockey's Growth as Fast as Contest Itself, December 27, 1935
Detroit Favored To Retain Title, November 17, 1936
Hockey Teams Take Aim at Detroit's 7-Year Run, November 14, 1955
Records Made To Be Broken But Not Richards' 500 Goals, October 26, 1957
Maple Leafs' Star Learns His Lesson (Frank Mahovlich), December 25, 1960
Canadiens' Line After All-Time Scoring Record, January 15, 1961
Stylish Harvey Organizes Rangers' Sustained Attack, December 7, 1961
All-Time Greatest in Hockey?  Those Who Know Say Howe, October 26, 1963

Basketball
The Scoreboard (Wilt Chamberlain), April 12, 1956
Robertson Runs Bearcats While Leading Scorers (Oscar Robertson), January 2, 1960
Lucas Could Have Own Way As Pro or In Business -- Now!, January 2, 1961
Pro Basketball Grows As Big As Its Players, November 3, 1961 
Lucas and Robertson Give Pro Basketball Another Big Show, November 11, 1963

Boxing
Louis' Hammering Fists 'Elixir' to Dying Fight Game (Joe Louis), December 20, 1935
Louis Old Dog Learning New Tricks for Marciano Match, October 22, 1951

Golf
More Golfers Should Have Yips Like Hogan, June 7, 1957 
Palmer's Open Win Gives Golf First Big Name Since Hogan, July 3, 1960
Nicklaus Compared With Jones With No Apologies, June 19, 1962
Arnie a One-Man Peace Corps (Arnold Palmer), November 17, 1962
Magic of Bobby Jones, April 8, 1964

Other
Sonja Henie Makes Country Ice Conscious and Rescues Arenas (Sonja Henie), January 21, 1938
Big Bill Tilden Picks Don Budge As Greatest of Tennis Players (Bill Tilden), February 22, 1945
Bobby Riggs Has Become No. 1 Tennis Promoter (Bobby Riggs), September 28, 1949

References

1894 births
1968 deaths
Baseball writers
Sportswriters from New York (state)
Journalists from Oregon
People from Astoria, Oregon
20th-century American journalists
American male journalists